This article is a non-exhaustive list of the châteaux located in the French department of Eure-et-Loir in the Centre-Val de Loire region.

List of châteaux

See also
 List of châteaux in Centre-Val de Loire
 List of châteaux in France
 List of castles in France

References

External links
American Commission for Protection and Salvage of Artistic and Historic Monuments in War Areas (1946)

Eure-et-Loir